Sternocera sternicornis is a species of beetles belonging to the Buprestidae family.

Subspecies
 Sternocera sternicornis orientalis (Herbst, 1801) 
 Sternocera sternicornis sternicoris (Linnaeus, 1758)

Description
The basic color of the elytra is metallic bright green, with small yellow or ash-colored eyespots. Two larger spots are present at the base of the elytra. The surface of the thorax is covered with deeply impressed punctures. The antennae and tarsi are blackish.

Distribution
This species can be found in India.

References

Buprestidae
Beetles described in 1758
Taxa named by Carl Linnaeus